Vila Franca do Campo is a town and municipality in the southern part of the island of São Miguel in the Portuguese Autonomous Region of the Azores. The population of the municipality was 11,229 in 2011, in an area of 77.97 km². The town proper, which incorporates the urbanized parishes São Miguel and São Pedro, has 4100 inhabitants.

History

Vila Franca do Campo displays its municipal motto, Quis sicut deus?, on its flag and on its coat-of-arms.  This Latin phrase means "Who is like God?"  It is a reference to St. Michael the Archangel for whom the island of São Miguel is named; in Hebrew, the name, Michael, means "he who is like God".

Founded in the middle of the 15th century by Gonçalo Vaz Botelho, the settlement was elevated to the status of vila (town) in 1472; Vila Franca do Campo quickly grew into the largest settlement and administrative seat of the island of São Miguel.

The greatest tragedy to befall the Azores occurred on 20 October 1522, when a violent earthquake hit the area of Vila Franca do Campo, then capital of the archipelago and most important Azorean settlement. During the earthquake and subsequent landslide, 5000 people were killed, with then Captain-Donatário Rui Gonçalves da Câmara II escaping the tragedy: he was relaxing in his summer home in Lagoa at the time of the tragedy. Many of the residents were buried alive from a landslide and debris. Because of its destruction, the capital of São Miguel was transferred to Ponta Delgada, where the Captain-Donatário installed his administration in a residence near the Church of São Pedro. King John III eventually elevated Ponta Delgada to the status of city on 2 April 1546, attracting more and more economic activity and settlement.

In the sequel of the 1582 naval battle off the coast of São Miguel, the Spanish victors had several hundred French and Portuguese prisoners executed in the town.

The town began to prosper again from the 18th century onwards from orange plantations, and later, from pineapple production.

Geography

Vila Franca do Campo Municipality is located east of Ponta Delgada via the Regional E.R.1-1ª roadway, while it is linked by mountain roads to the eastern and northern communities (including Lagoa, Furnas and Povoação). Most of the mountainous areas of the municipality are forested, interspersed with pasturelands and fields dedicated to agriculture and grazing.

These ravines that cross the municipality include the Ribeira da s Três Voltas, Ribeira da Praia and Ribeira da Mãe d'Água.

The relief of this region is characterized by basaltic rock and projectiles from volcanic activities on the island, forming many of the distinctive geomorphological structures, such as: the islet of Vila Franca, Pico d'El-Rei (674 m), Monte Escuro (890 m), Lombados Pisões (258 m), Miradouro (685 m), Lagoa do Fogo and  Ponta da Pirâmide.

Administratively, the six parishes of Vila Franca do Campo Municipality include:

 Água de Alto, the 1624 resident population (2001 Census), located on the western border of the municipality is known for the beaches and coves that hug the coast; initially a settlement of thirty homes in the 15th century, it was a locality within the civil parish of São Pedro until 1908, when it was deannexed from the local administrative authority and incorporated;
 Ponta Garça, the largest within Vila Franca, and longest by extension in the Azores, Ponta Garça includes a population of 3577 inhabitants located along a lateral roadway that hugs the clifftops of the south-central region to the small fajãs/beaches of Povoação;
 Ribeira das Tainhas, with 782 residents, the smallest parish in area, it was historically an agricultural centre involved in the cultivation and exportation of oranges and wine, through the Porto de Calhau de Areia;
 Ribeira Seca
 São Miguel
 São Pedro

Architecture

Civic
 Lighthouse of Ponta Garça, the 20th century lighthouse includes a single circular tower and main block, similar to other modernist structures of this type, such as the lighthouses of Ponte do Cintrão (Ribeira Grande) and Ponta dos Rosais (Rosais)

Religious
 Church of Bom Jesus da Pedra, the hospital was instituted in 1483, after Isabel Gonçalves (widow of Afonso Gonçalves), donated the home in which she lived (after her heirs refused the home and were disinherited). After 1552 the building was already referred to as a possession of the Santa Casa da Misericórdia, where a chapel/church was part of the building. Over the intervening years the church evolved into a complex three nave structure, decorated in the Manueline style with ornate frontispiece and doorways.
 Church of Bom Jesus Menino, the simple church, includes a plain facade with oculus over the doorway;
 Church of São João Baptista
 Church of São Lazaro, the three story 18th century church is secluded in the upper roads of Água de Alto, first referenced in the testament of João Afonso, of Grotas Fundas in 1511;
 Church of São Miguel Arcanjo, often confused as the Church of Nossa Senhora da Pedra, the 15th century church is one of the oldest in the Azores, with unpainted brick facade and orante interior that includes 16th century organ, gilded and azulejo-decorated chancel;
 Church of Nossa Senhora da Piedade, the 3 story simple Manuelinesque church developed from the construction of a small temple in 1530, through the initiative of Lopo Anes de Araújo, son in law of Rui Vaz, in a letter dated 15 January 1696;
 Convent of São Francisco, the convent of Saint Francis of Assisi was reconstructed following the 1522 earthquake to house religious sisters, but following several social convulsions, in the late 20th century it was readapted as local tourist lodging;
 Hermitage of Mãe de Deus, the small ornate hermitage was donated to the municipal council of Vila Franca in 1984 by Inácio de Melo and his family, and includes several Manueline-style flourishes in the portico and bell-tower;
 Hermitage of Nossa Senhora da Paz, the simple hermitage was elaborated into an important scenic attraction with the construction in 1967 of a staircase to represent Pais Nossos dos Mistérios Gozosos e Dolorosos (Our Father and Joyful/Sorrowful Mysteries) prayer, separated into ten flights to symbolize the Ave Maria prayer;
 Hermitage of Santa Catarina, located on the coastal street connecting the lower town to the fishing port (and identifiable for the statue of Henry the Navigator located in its square), the 16th century Mannerist hermitage (today dedicated to fisherman) was first identified by Nuno Gonçalves in 1504;
 Hermitage of Santo Amaro, the historian/priest Gaspar Frutuoso referred to the existence of this hermitage in the area of Relva in Vila Franca, which became the seat of a religious brotherhood, located at the doorstep of Miguel da Grã's farm;
 Hermitage of São João Baptista, this hermitage is located on the town's outskirts on a hilltop in the direction of Furnas; a 16th-century chapel, it is simple with an interior niche displaying the image of John the Baptist which is popular displayed during annual festivals;

Notable people 
 Bento de Góis (1562 in Vila Franca do Campo – 1607) a Jesuit brother, missionary and explorer; the first known European to travel overland from India to China, via current day Afghanistan and the Pamir Mountains.
 Armando Fontes (born 1958 in Vila Franca do Campo) a former footballer with 166 club caps

References
Notes

External links

 Natural Landscapes from Vila Franca do Campo
 Photos from Vila Franca do Campo

 
Municipalities of the Azores
Municipalities of São Miguel Island
Populated places established in the 15th century